Caue may refer to:

People
 Cauê Benicio (born 1978), Brazilian midfielder
 Cauê Macris (born 1983), Brazilian politician
 Cauê (footballer, born 1986), Cauê Santos da Mata, Brazilian football midfielder
 Cauê (footballer, born 1987), Roberto Carvalho Cauê, Brazilian football defender
 Caue Fernandes (born 1988), Brazilian football defender
 Cauê (footballer, born 1989), Cauê Cecilio da Silva, Brazilian football midfielder
 Cauê (footballer, born 2002), Cauê Vinícius dos Santos, Brazilian football forward

Other uses
 Caué District, district of São Tomé and Príncipe
 Cauê (mascot), mascot for the 2007 Pan American Games